Bukūri Yongšon (? – ?) was a legendary ancestor of the future emperors of the Qing dynasty.

Legend
Bukūri Yongšon was claimed the progenitor of the Aisin Gioro clan by Hong Taiji, which would be the imperial family of China in the future. According to the legend, three heavenly maidens, namely Enggulen (恩古倫), Jenggulen (正古倫) and Fekulen (佛庫倫), were bathing at a lake called Bulhūri Omo near the Changbai Mountains. A magpie dropped a piece of red fruit near Fekulen, who ate it. She then became pregnant with Bukūri Yongšon.

However, another older version of the story by the Hurha (Hurka) tribe member Muksike recorded in 1635 contradicts Hong Taiji's version on location, claiming that it was in Heilongjiang province close to the Amur river at Bukuri mountain where Bulhuri lake was located where the "heavenly maidens" took their bath. This was recorded in the Jiu Manzhou Dang and is much shorter and simpler in addition to being older. This is believed to be the original version and Hongtaiji changed it to Changbai mountain. It shows that the Aisin Gioro clan originated in the Amur area and the Heje (Hezhen) and other Amur valley Jurchen tribes had an oral version of the same tale. It also fits with Jurchen history since some ancestors of the Manchus originated north before the 14th-15th centuries in the Amur and only later moved south.

Legacy
After the Qing dynasty was established, he was given the temple name "Shizu" (始祖).

Notes 

Manchu people